Lila Devi (21 March 1919 –  December 1972) was an Indian politician. She was a Member of Parliament, representing Himachal Pradesh in the Rajya Sabha the upper house of India's Parliament as a member of the Indian National Congress.

Devi's death was announced on 8 December 1972, at the age of 53.

References

1919 births
1972 deaths
Indian National Congress politicians
Rajya Sabha members from Himachal Pradesh
Women in Himachal Pradesh politics
Women members of the Rajya Sabha